568 Collins Street is a mixed–use skyscraper in Melbourne, Victoria, Australia.

The building was first proposed in 2011 and later approved by then-Planning Minister Matthew Guy in early 2012. The skyscraper reaches 224 metres in height– making it one of the tallest buildings in Melbourne. The tower includes 588 residential apartments spanning across 69 levels, as well as offices.

Construction on the $161 million project commenced in mid-2012 and was completed in September 2015. At the time of its completion, 568 Collins Street became the equal 11th–tallest building in Melbourne to roof and equal 25th–tallest overall.

See also

 List of tallest buildings in Melbourne
 Architecture of Melbourne

Gallery

References

External links
 

Skyscrapers in Melbourne
Residential skyscrapers in Australia
Apartment buildings in Melbourne
Skyscraper office buildings in Australia
Residential buildings completed in 2015
Collins Street, Melbourne
Buildings and structures in Melbourne City Centre
2015 establishments in Australia